Carmen is a town in Alfalfa County, Oklahoma, United States. The population was 355 at the 2010 census.

Geography

Carmen lies along State Highway 45.  It shared a school district with the nearby town of Dacoma until the school was closed.

Demographics

As of the census of 2000, there were 411 people, 175 households, and 110 families residing in the town. There were 248 housing units at an average density of 164.2 per square mile (63.4/km2). The racial makeup of the town was 94.89% White, 0.49% African American, 1.95% Native American, 0.49% from other races, and 2.19% from two or more races. Hispanic or Latino of any race were 1.70% of the population.

There were 175 households, out of which 26.9% had children under the age of 18 living with them, 53.1% were married couples living together, 7.4% had a female householder with no husband present, and 37.1% were non-families. 34.3% of all households were made up of individuals, and 18.9% had someone living alone who was 65 years of age or older. The average household size was 2.35 and the average family size was 3.04.

In the town, the population was spread out, with 24.8% under the age of 18, 6.8% from 18 to 24, 22.4% from 25 to 44, 22.4% from 45 to 64, and 23.6% who were 65 years of age or older. The median age was 42 years. For every 100 females, there were 82.7 males. For every 100 females age 18 and over, there were 82.8 males.

The median income for a household in the town was $25,769, and the median income for a family was $31,354. Males had a median income of $26,944 versus $21,250 for females. The per capita income for the town was $16,833. About 19.8% of families and 25.0% of the population were below the poverty line, including 48.0% of those under age 18 and 6.3% of those age 65 or over.

References

External links
 Encyclopedia of Oklahoma History and Culture - Carmen

Towns in Alfalfa County, Oklahoma
Towns in Oklahoma